The 1987–88 Liga Artzit season saw Hapoel Jerusalem win the title and promotion to Liga Leumit. Runners-up Hapoel Tiberias were also promoted.

At the other end of the table, Hakoah Ramat Gan and Hapoel Acre were relegated to Liga Alef.

Final table

Promotion group

Relegation group

See also
1987–88 Liga Leumit

References
Previous seasons The Israel Football Association 

Liga Artzit seasons
Israel
2